Johnny Terney Hansen (born 14 November 1943) is a Danish former professional footballer who played as a defender. He most notably played six years as a professional for German club Bayern Munich, with whom he won multiple domestic and international titles. He played 45 matches and scored three goals for the Denmark national football team between 1965 and 1978, and won the 1967 Danish Player of the Year award.

Biography 
Johnny Terney Hansen was born in Vejle, and started his career in local top-flight club Vejle Boldklub. He debuted for the Danish national team in September 1965, and instantly commanded a place in the national team starting line-up. Having been named Danish Player of the Year in 1967, he moved abroad to play professionally in 1968. He signed with 1. FC Nürnberg in the top-flight German Bundesliga. As the Danish national team was restricted to amateur players, Hansen was dropped from the national team.

After two years in Nuremberg, the club had been relegated, and Hansen moved on to Bundesliga club Bayern Munich in 1970. At Bayern, he became a regular starter in the right fullback position. His time at Bayern Munich was very successful. In Hansen's first year at the club, they won the 1971 DFB-Pokal cup trophy, and finished second in the Bundesliga. As the Danish rule of amateurism was abolished in 1971, Hansen returned to the national team.

Hansen was the first player to score in a Bundesliga match at the Olympic Stadium in Munich in June 1972 when Bayern secured the Championship with a 5–1 win over runner up against Schalke 04. The game was the last round of the 1972 Bundesliga, when Bayern and FC Schalke 04 decided the championship between them, in front of 79.012 spectators. Bayern won 5–1. In the following years, Bayern swept the Bundesliga, winning the 1972, 1973 and 1974 championships. For three years in a row, from 1974 to 1976, the club also won the international European Cup tournament each year. Hansen followed the 1975 final from his sickbed, but played in the 1974 and 1976 finals. In 1976, Hansen also helped Bayern Munich win the Intercontinental Cup.

After eight seasons in Germany, Hansen returned to Vejle Boldklub in 1976. He won the 1977 Danish Cup and 1978 Danish championship with Vejle, before retiring at the end of the 1978 season. He played a total 214 games for Vejle.

Honours

Club
 DFB-Pokal: 1970–71
 Bundesliga: 1971–72, 1972–73, 1973–74
 European Cup: 1973–74, 1974–75, 1975–76
 Intercontinental Cup: 1976
 Danish Cup: 1976–77
 Danish championship: 1978

Individual
 Danish Player of the Year: 1967

References

External links 
 Danish national team profile 
 

1943 births
Living people
Expatriate footballers in West Germany
Danish men's footballers
Denmark international footballers
Vejle Boldklub players
Bundesliga players
FC Bayern Munich footballers
1. FC Nürnberg players
Association football defenders
People from Vejle Municipality
UEFA Champions League winning players
Danish expatriate sportspeople in West Germany
Sportspeople from the Region of Southern Denmark